Fotso is a surname. Notable people with the surname include:

Faustine Fotso, Cameroonian scientist and lawyer
Joseph Fotso, Cameroonian footballer
Kareyce Fotso, Cameroonian singer
Kate Fotso, Cameroonian businesswoman
Stéphanie Fotso Mogoung, Cameroonian volleyball player
Victor Fotso (1926–2020), Cameroonian politician